B'nai Israel Synagogue is a historic synagogue on NY 52 in Woodbourne, Town of Fallsburg, Sullivan County, New York. The first rabbi of the synagogue was David Isaac Godlin (1868-1943). It was built in 1920 and is a two-story building above a shallow concrete basement.  It is a wood-frame structure, three bays wide by four bays deep and surmounted by a steep gable roof with deep wooden cornice.

In the spring of 2010 Mordechai Jungreis, Rebbe of the Nikolsburg-Woodbourne Hasidic dynasty, began using the synagogue. Jungreis, who has a synagogue in the Borough Park neighborhood of Brooklyn, New York, has attracted a large following of Jews. Services take place there all day long from early morning to past midnight. The synagogue was initially used during the summer months, from Memorial day to Labor Day, when Sullivan County sees a large influx of Jewish vacationers. After COVID more people began using the synagogue during the year and now it is currently open all year long. Check the schedule of services during the winter months as Minyan is not as common as during the summer.

It was added to the National Register of Historic Places in 1999.

References

External links
 A video of the Rebbe making a blessing
 A video of the Rebbe dancing at a wedding of one of his followers

Czech-American culture in New York (state)
Czech-Jewish culture in the United States
Synagogues in Sullivan County, New York
Synagogues on the National Register of Historic Places in New York (state)
National Register of Historic Places in Sullivan County, New York
Synagogues completed in 1922